Birds Make Good Neighbors is the second album by North Carolina indie rock band The Rosebuds.  It was released on September 13, 2005 by Merge Records on CD, and one week later on vinyl by Goodnight Records.

It received generally positive reviews, with a score of 78/100 on Metacritic.

Track listing
"Hold Hands and Fight" – 2:47
"Boxcar" – 3:39
"Leaves Do Fall" – 3:53
"Wildcat" – 2:39
"The Lovers' Rights" – 2:22
"Blue Bird" – 4:26
"Outnumbered" – 2:57
"Shake Our Tree" – 2:43
"Let Us Go" – 3:54
"Warm Where You Lay" – 2:53
"4-Track Love Song" – 4:16

Personnel
 Kelly Crisp - vocals, piano, keyboards, Wurlitzer, hand claps
 Ivan Howard - vocals, guitar, keyboards, hand claps
 Lee Waters - drums and percussion
 Wes Phillips - stand-up bass

The Rosebuds albums
2005 albums
Merge Records albums
Albums produced by Brian Paulson